Beatrice Long Visitor Holy Dance was an Oglala Lakota speaker and activist from the Pine Ridge Reservation in South Dakota, best known for her participation in the group  known as the International Council of 13 Indigenous Grandmothers, which was founded in New York in 2004. In 2008, The 13 Indigenous Grandmothers, including Beatrice, hand delivered a petition to Pope Benedict XVI asking to revoke the three papal bulls authorizing the conversion and subjugation of the Indigenous Peoples of America. This letter went unanswered.

Biography 
Beatrice Long Visitor Holy Dance is daughter to Antonia Long Visitor Holy Dance and younger sister to Rita Long Visitor Holy Dance.  Beatrice was sent to a Roman Catholic boarding school at age 7. After graduating, she and Rita worked in a potato field, earning 3 cents per bushel of potatoes. She and Rita wed in a double wedding.

She was a  member of the Native American Church and a participant in ceremonies in her community. She worked in health care, with a focus on people with diabetes. She was part of a youth ambassador program with her sister that aimed to connect young people with Native American spirituality.

She drove a truck on the reservation for decades delivering medicines. In 2012 she hosted a workshop for girls on "how to properly cut buffalo meat and dry it."

Quote 
We have to keep repeating the prayers over and over again. When I reflect on my life of 79 years, I see a flat road of destruction. Youths are dying of drugs and ozone layer is depleting. The most powerful tool with us is to pray and pray with other communities for world peace.

The International Council of 13 Grandmothers 

In 2004, Beatrice was approached by the directors of The Center for Sacred Studies to join their group, the International Council of 13 Indigenous Grandmothers.

In 2009, The Gazette of Colorado Springs, Colorado described her schedule with the Grandmothers as "hectic", noting that she traveled by "Greyhound bus or car, driven by her daughter Loretta Long Visitor."

In 2008, she joined the 13 Grandmothers group in delivering a petition to Pope Benedict XVI in Vatican City by hand, requesting the Pope to revoke the three papal bulls authorizing the conversion and subjugation of the indigenous peoples of the Americas.

The Papal Bulls that the Grandmothers are demanding to be revoked are:
Dum Diversas, June 18, 1452
Romanus Pontifex, January 8, 1455
Inter Caetera, May 4, 1493
The Grandmothers received no response after this request.

However, the letter which Beatrice Long Visitor Holy Dance wrote on this topic was featured on the National Catholic Reporter website, under the title "The past is a very living thing: Try not to forget it."

She was interviewed about her work with the 13 Grandmothers group by the Women Rising Radio Project in 2011.

Death

Beatrice Long Visitor Holy Dance died in 2016; her life was celebrated for four days from 25 August to 28 August 2016 with a Creation to Completion Ceremony in Phoenicia, New York where the grandmothers group first began their mission.

Notes

References 
Grandmothers' Council website, About the Grandmothers 
Native Village Publications,  
Sacred Studies, Grandmother's Biographies
Schaefer, C. (2006) Grandmothers Council the World: wise women elders offer their vision for our planet. Trumpeter Books 978-1-59030-293-4

External links 

 International Council of 13 of Indigenous Grandmothers Official Website
 Official website for documentary 
 For The Next Seven Generations Film Trailer
 The Center for Sacred Studies
Statement of the International Council of Thirteen Indigenous Grandmothers
 

American humanitarians
Women humanitarians
American environmentalists
American women environmentalists
Female Native American leaders
Native American activists
Sustainability advocates
People from the Pine Ridge Indian Reservation, South Dakota
Oglala people
Year of birth missing
2016 deaths
Native American Church
American animists
21st-century American women
21st-century Native American women
21st-century Native Americans
20th-century Native American women
20th-century Native Americans